The play-off first legs were played on 6–7 October 2006, while the second legs were played on 10–11 October 2006. Winners of play-off round qualified to the championship played the following year in June, where Netherlands was chosen to host the tournament.

Matches

|}

First leg

Second leg

Czech Republic won 3–2 on aggregate

Serbia won 5–3 on aggregate

England won 3–0 on aggregate

Italy won 2–1 on aggregate

4–4 on aggregate, Portugal won on away goals rule

Belgium won 5–2 on aggregate

Israel won 2–1 on aggregate

External links
 Play-offs at UEFA.com

Play-offs
Play
UEFA European Under-21 Championship qualification play-offs